Santis or Säntis refers to:

Säntis, a mountain in Switzerland
Canton of Säntis, a former canton in Switzerland named after the above mountain
Säntis (ship, 1957), a ship on Lake Zurich

See also
DeSantis (or De Santis), a common surname